Muhammad Tarek (born 1 January 2002) is an Egyptian professional footballer who plays as a defender for Egyptian Premier League club Zamalek.

References

Egyptian footballers
Living people
2002 births
Zamalek SC players